Health impact assessment (HIA) is defined as "a combination of procedures, methods, and tools by
which a policy, program, or project may be judged as to its potential effects on the
health of a population, and the distribution of those effects within the population."

Overview
HIA is intended to produce a set of evidence-based recommendations to inform decision-making . HIA seeks to maximise the positive health impacts and minimise the negative health impacts of proposed policies, programs or projects.

The procedures of HIA are similar to those used in other forms of impact assessment, such as environmental impact assessment or social impact assessment. HIA is usually described as following the steps listed, though many practitioners break these into sub-steps or label them differently:

 Screening - determining if an HIA is warranted/required
 Scoping - determining which impacts will be considered and the plan for the HIA
 Identification and assessment of impacts - determining the magnitude, nature, extent and likelihood of potential health impacts, using a variety of different methods and types of information
 Decision-making and recommendations - making explicit the trade-offs to be made in decision-making and formulating evidence-informed recommendations
 Evaluation, monitoring and follow-up - process and impact evaluation of the HIA and the monitoring and management of health impacts

The main objective of HIA is to apply existing knowledge and evidence about health impacts, to specific social and community contexts, to develop evidence-based recommendations that inform decision-making in order to protect and improve community health and wellbeing. Because of financial and time constraints, HIAs do not generally involve new research or the generation of original scientific knowledge. However, the findings of HIAs, especially where these have been monitored and evaluated over time, can be used to inform other HIAs in contexts that are similar. An HIA's recommendations may focus on both design and operational aspects of a proposal.

HIA has also been identified as a mechanism by which potential health inequalities can be identified and redressed prior to the implementation of proposed policy, program or project .

A number of manuals and guidelines for HIA's use have been developed (see further reading).

Determinants of health
The proposition that policies, programs and projects have the potential to change the determinants of health underpins HIA's use. Changes to health determinants then leads to changes in health outcomes or the health status of individuals and communities. The determinants of health are largely environmental and social, so that there are many overlaps with environmental impact assessment and social impact assessment.

Levels of HIA
Three forms of HIA exist:

 Desk-based HIA, which takes 2–6 weeks for one assessor to complete and provides a broad overview of potential health impacts;
 Rapid HIA, which takes approximately 12 weeks for one assessor to complete and provides more detailed information on potential health impacts; and
 Comprehensive HIA, which takes approximately 6 months for one assessor and provides a in-depth assessment of potential health impacts. 

It has been suggested that HIAs can be prospective (done before a proposal is implemented), concurrent (done while the proposal is being implemented) or retrospective (done after a proposal has been implemented) . This remains controversial, however, with a number of HIA practitioners suggesting that concurrent HIA is better regarded as a monitoring activity and that retrospective HIA is more akin to evaluation with a health focus, rather than being assessment per se . Prospective HIA is preferred as it allows the maximum practical opportunity to influence decision-making and subsequent health impacts.

HIA practitioners
HIA practitioners can be found in the private and public sectors, but are relatively few in number. There are no universally accepted competency frameworks or certification processes. It is suggested that a lead practitioner should have extensive education and training in a health related field, experience of participating in HIAs, and have attended an HIA training course. It has been suggested and widely accepted that merely having a medical or health degree should not be regarded as an indication of competency.

The International Association for Impact Assessment has an active health section.

A HIA People Directory can be found on the HIA GATEWAY.

HIA worldwide
HIA used around the world, most notably in Europe, North America, Australia, New Zealand, Africa and Thailand .

The safeguard policies and standards of the International Finance Corporation (IFC), part of the World Bank, were established in 2006. These contain a requirement for health impact assessment in large projects. The standards have been accepted by most of the leading lending banks who are parties to the Equator Principles. Health impact assessments are becoming routine in many large development projects in both public and private sectors of developing countries. There is also a long history of health impact assessment in the water resource development sector - large dams and irrigation systems.

See also
Impact Assessment
Environmental impact assessment
Equality Impact Assessment
Four-Step Impact Assessment
Healthy development measurement tool
Risk assessment
Social impact assessment
Health promotion
Jakarta Declaration
Ottawa Charter for Health Promotion
Health protection
Environmental health
List of environmental health hazards
Precautionary principle
Risk assessment
Population health
Public health
Social determinants of health

References
 .
 .
 .
 .
 .
 .
 .

This page uses Harvard referencing. References are sorted alphabetically by author surname.

Further reading

Books and edited book chapters
 .
 .
 .
 .
 .
 . Includes several chapters on HIA.

Journal articles
 .
 
 .
 .
 .
 .
 
 .
 .

Journal special issues
 .
 .
 .
 .
 .
 .

Manuals and guidelines
 .
 .
 .
 .
 .
 .
 .
 . 
 
 .
 .

This page uses Harvard referencing. Further reading categories are sorted alphabetically; citations are sorted by year (newest to oldest), then alphabetically by author surname within years. If citations are included in the references section they are not listed in the further reading section.

HIA resource websites
 Health Impact Project - Funding for HIA and resources
 HIA Connect
 HIA Gateway
 IMPACT - International Health Impact Assessment Consortium
 RIVM HIA Database
 World Health Organization HIA Site

Government HIA websites
 Environmental Health Branch, New South Wales Health (Australia)
 European Centre for Health Policy (Belgium)
 HPP-HIA Program (Thailand)
 Institute for Public Health in Ireland (Ireland)
 Planning for Healthy Places with Health Impact Assessments (United States)
 San Francisco Department of Public Health (United States)
 Centers for Disease Control and Prevention (United States)
US Environmental Protection Agency (United States)

University HIA websites
 Monash University, SHIA@Monash (Melbourne, Australia)
 University of Birmingham, HIA Research Unit (Birmingham, UK)
 University of California, Berkeley, Health Impact Group, School of Public Health (Berkeley, USA)
 University of California, Los Angeles, HIA Project (Los Angeles, USA)
 University of California, Los Angeles, Health Impact Assessment Clearinghouse Learning and Information Center (Los Angeles, USA)
 University of Liverpool, IMPACT - International Health Impact Assessment Consortium Department of Public Health and Policy.(Liverpool, UK)
 University of New South Wales, HIA Connect, Health Inequalities, Health Impact Assessment and Healthy Public Policy Program (CHETRE), Research Centre for Primary Health Care and Equity, Faculty of Medicine (Sydney, Australia)
 University of Otago, Health, Wellbeing and Equity Impact Assessment Unit, Wellington School of Medicine and Health Sciences (Wellington, New Zealand)

Professional associations
 IAIA
 Society for Practitioners of Health Impact Assessment (SOPHIA)

Other HIA websites
 Health Impact Assessment - International (Email Discussion Group)
 HIA Blog
 HIA Blog on Twitter

This page uses Harvard referencing. External links are sorted alphabetically.

Public health
Human geography
Impact assessment
Health care quality
Health economics